President's Leadership Class may refer to:

 Presidents Leadership Class - A leadership institution for undergraduates at the University of Colorado
 President's Leadership Class (Purdue University) - A leadership class at Purdue University in Indiana